The title of Earl of Falmouth has been created twice, once in the Peerage of England and the second time in the Peerage of the United Kingdom. The first creation, on 17 March 1664, was for Charles Berkeley, 1st Viscount Fitzhardinge, who was at the same time created Baron Botetourt of Langport. It became extinct upon his death the following year. The second creation, on 14 July 1821, was for Edward Boscawen, 4th Viscount Falmouth. It became extinct in 1852.

Earl of Falmouth, first creation (1664)
Charles Berkeley, 1st Earl of Falmouth (bef. 1636–1665)

Earl of Falmouth, second creation (1821)
Edward Boscawen, 1st Earl of Falmouth (1787–1841)
George Henry Boscawen, 2nd Earl of Falmouth (1811–1852)

See also

Viscount Falmouth
Viscount Fitzhardinge

References

Extinct earldoms in the Peerage of England
Extinct earldoms in the Peerage of the United Kingdom
Boscawen family
Noble titles created in 1664
Noble titles created in 1821
Noble titles created for UK MPs